chsh (an abbreviation of "change shell") is a command on Unix-like operating systems that is used to change a login shell.  Users can either supply the pathname of the shell that they wish to change to on the command line, or supply no arguments, in which case  allows the user to change the shell interactively.

Usage
 is a setuid program that modifies the  file, and only allows ordinary users to modify their own login shells. The superuser can modify the shells of other users, by supplying the name of the user whose shell is to be modified as a command-line argument. For security reasons, the shells that both ordinary users and the superuser can specify are limited by the contents of the  file, with the pathname of the shell being required to be exactly as it appears in that file. (This security feature is alterable by re-compiling the source code for the command with a different configuration option, and thus is not necessarily enabled on all systems.)

On most systems, when  is invoked without the  command-line option (to specify the name of the shell), it prompts the user to select one.  On Mac OS X, if invoked without the  option,  displays a text file in the default editor (initially set to vim) allowing the user to change all of the features of their user account that they are permitted to change, the pathname of the shell being the name next to "Shell:".  When the user quits vim, the changes made there are transferred to the /etc/passwd file which only root can change directly.   

Using the  option greatly simplifies the task of changing shells.

Depending on the system,  may or may not prompt the user for a password before changing the shell, or entering interactive mode.

On many Linux distributions, the  command is a PAM-aware application.  As such, its behaviour can be tailored, using PAM configuration options, for individual users.  For example, an  directive that specifies the  module can be used to deny  access to individual users, by specifying a file of the usernames to deny access to with the  option to that module (along with the  option).

Portability
Most Unix-like systems provide . SVr4-based systems provided a similar capability with passwd. The exception is Solaris, where non-administrators are unable to change their shell unless a network name server such as NIS or NIS+ is installed. The obsolete SGI SVr4 system IRIX64 also lacked .

See also
 Comparison of command shells

References

Further reading

External links

 
 
 
 

Unix user management and support-related utilities
Standard Unix programs